The Enchanted Snake or The Snake is an Italian fairy tale.  Giambattista Basile wrote a variant in the Pentamerone. Andrew Lang drew upon this variant, for inclusion in The Green Fairy Book.

It is Aarne-Thompson type 425A, the search for the lost husband. Others of this type include The Black Bull of Norroway, The Brown Bear of Norway, The Daughter of the Skies, The Enchanted Pig, The Tale of the Hoodie, Master Semolina, The Sprig of Rosemary, East of the Sun and West of the Moon, and White-Bear-King-Valemon.

Synopsis

A poor woman longed for a child.  One day, she saw a little snake in the forest and said that even snakes had children; the little snake offered to be hers.  The woman and her husband raised the snake.  When it was grown, it wanted to marry, and not to another snake but to the king's daughter.  The father went to ask, and the king said that the snake should have her if he could turn all the fruit in the orchard into gold.  The snake told his father to gather up all the pits he could find and sow them in the orchard; when they sprang up, all the fruits were gold.

The king then demanded that the walls and paths of his palace be turned to precious stones; the snake had his father gathered up broken crockery and threw it at the walls and paths, which transformed them, making them glitter with the many coloured gems.

The king then demanded that the castle be turned to gold; the snake had his father rub the walls with a herb, which transformed them.

The king told his daughter, Grannonia, he had tried to put off this suitor but failed.  Grannonia said that she would obey him. The snake came in a car of gold, drawn by elephants; everyone else ran off in fright, but Grannonia stood her ground.  The snake took her into a room, where he shed his skin and became a handsome young man.  The king, fearing that his daughter was being eaten, looked through the keyhole, and seeing this, grabbed the skin and burned it.  The youth exclaimed that the king was a fool, turned into a dove, and flew off.

Grannonia set out in search of him.  She met a fox and traveled with him.  In the morning as the princess remarked on the wondrous sounds of the birdsongs, the fox told her the birdsong would be even better if she knew what the birds were saying:  that a prince had been cursed to take a snake's form for seven years, that near the end of the time, he had fallen in love with and married a princess, but that his snake skin had been burned, and he had struck his head while he fled, and was now in the care of doctors.  The fox then told her that the blood of the birds would cure him, and he caught them for her.  Then he told her that his blood was also needed; she persuaded him to go with her and killed him.

She went to her husband's father and promised to cure the prince if he would marry her; the king agreed and she cured him.  The prince refused because he had already pledged himself to another woman.  The princess, pleased, revealed that she was that woman and they married.

Analysis

Motifs
The urging of her father to marry the beast because he had promised her represents a factor clearly present in arranged marriages.  This tale has been interpreted as symbolically representing an arranged marriage; the bride's revulsion to marrying a stranger being symbolized by his bestial form.

The episode of the heroine overhearing the animals that talk about how to cure the ailed prince occurs in tale type ATU 432, "The Prince as Bird".

Adaptations
The tale was also part of Fairy Tales of the Allied Nations, a compilation of fairy tales by famed illustrator Edmund Dulac, with the name The Serpent Prince.

See also

The Blue Bird
The Canary Prince
The Green Knight
The Snake Prince
The Three Sisters
 Prince Sobur

References

Italian fairy tales
Fiction about shapeshifting
Fictional snakes
ATU 400-459